James Kirk VC (27 January 1897 – 4 November 1918) was an English recipient of the Victoria Cross, the highest and most prestigious award for gallantry in the face of the enemy.

Kirk was born on 27 January 1897 in Cheadle Hulme, Cheshire to James and Rachel Kirk. He enlisted as a private in the Manchester Regiment in 1915, and was commissioned as a second lieutenant in June 1918. Kirk was a 21-year-old second lieutenant in the 10th Battalion, The Manchester Regiment, British Army, attached to the 2nd Battalion during the First World War when the actions that led to his recognition took place.

Citation

References

Further reading
Monuments to Courage (David Harvey, 1999)
The Register of the Victoria Cross (This England, 1997)
VCs of the First World War - The Final Days 1918 (Gerald Gliddon, 2000)

External links
 

1897 births
1918 deaths
Military personnel from Cheshire
People from Cheadle Hulme
British World War I recipients of the Victoria Cross
British Army personnel of World War I
Manchester Regiment officers
British military personnel killed in World War I
British Army recipients of the Victoria Cross